Vyacheslav Nikolayevich Alanov (30 October 1939 – 26 August 1983) was a Soviet long-distance runner. He competed in the men's 10,000 metres at the 1968 Summer Olympics.

References

1939 births
1983 deaths
Athletes (track and field) at the 1968 Summer Olympics
Soviet male long-distance runners
Olympic athletes of the Soviet Union